Tivoli Theatre may refer to:

Australia
 Tivoli Theatre, now Her Majesty's Theatre, Adelaide 
 The Tivoli, Brisbane (formerly Tivoli Theatre)
 Tivoli Theatre, Melbourne (closed 1966)
 Tivoli Theatre, Sydney (demolished 1929) originally the Garrick Theatre, Sydney
 New Tivoli Theatre, Sydney (demolished 1969)

Canada
 Tivoli Theatre, in Walkerville, Ontario (renovated as the Old Walkerville Theatre)
 Tivoli Theatre, Saskatoon, later the Odeon Events Centre
 Tivoli Theatre (Toronto)

Ireland
 Tivoli Variety Theatre, Dublin (historic)
 Tivoli Theatre (Dublin)

UK
Tivoli Theatre of Varieties, London
 Tivoli Theatre, Aberdeen, Scotland
 Tivoli Theatre (Wimborne Minster), Dorset

US
 Tivoli Theater (Downers Grove, Illinois)
 Tivoli Theatre (Chattanooga, Tennessee)
 Tivoli Theatre (Chicago)
 Tivoli Theatre (Los Angeles)
 Tivoli Theatre (University City, Missouri)
 Tivoli Theatre (Washington, D.C.)

See also
 Tivoli circuit, a former group of Tivoli Theatres in several cities in Australia 
 Tivoli (disambiguation)

Lists of theatres